Spring cleaning is the practice of thoroughly cleaning a house in the springtime.

Spring Cleaning may also refer to:

 Spring Cleaning, a 1925 play
 Spring Cleaning (album), a 2009 album by Before Braille
 The Spring Cleaning, a 1908 children's book by Frances Hodgson Burnett
 "Spring Cleaning", a song on the album One Jug of Wine, Two Vessels by Bright Eyes